Gül Çiray Akbaş (27 November 1939 – 25 August 2019) was a Turkish middle-distance runner. She competed in the women's 800 metres at the 1960 Summer Olympics.

References

1939 births
2019 deaths
Athletes (track and field) at the 1960 Summer Olympics
Turkish female middle-distance runners
Olympic athletes of Turkey
People from Vidin